Heterotheca subaxillaris, known by the common name camphorweed, is a North American species of flowering plant in the family Asteraceae. It is widespread across much of the United States (from California to Massachusetts) as well as Mexico and Belize.

Heterotheca subaxillaris is a perennial, aromatic herb up to 203 centimeters (80 inches or 6 2/3 feet) in height, often with several erect stems. The stems are hairy to bristly. The inflorescence contains 3-180 flower heads in a flat-topped array. Each head contains 15–35;  yellow ray florets surrounding 25–60 disc florets at the center.

Chemistry
The leaf volatiles from which the name "camphorweed" is derived include camphor, but as a minor constituent (less than 2%); of 41 documented volatiles, for example, caryophyllene, pinene, borneol, myrcene, and limonene each comprised over 5% of the total.

References

External links
Photo of herbarium specimen collected in Nuevo León in Mexico in 2003

subaxillaris
Flora of North America
Plants described in 1789